Qataria is a genus of large benthic forams with a discoidal test over 6mm in diameter fully developed. The interior is complex with chambers divided into chamberlets. The wall is of microgranular calcite.    Related genera include Haurania  Spiraloconulus and Saudia, also members of the Spirocyclinidae.

Qataria is known from the Upper Cretaceous (upper Cenomanian or Turonian) of the Qatar peninsula, Arabia, where first found.

References 

Loftusiida
Prehistoric Foraminifera genera